1998 saw many sequels and prequels in video games, such as F-Zero X, Marvel vs. Capcom, The Legend of Zelda: Ocarina of Time, Metal Gear Solid, Pocket Monsters: Pikachu, Resident Evil 2, Sonic Adventure, Street Fighter Alpha 3, The House of the Dead 2, and Tomb Raider III, along with new titles such as Banjo-Kazooie, Dance Dance Revolution, Gex: Enter the Gecko, Half-Life, MediEvil, Parasite Eve, Radiant Silvergun, Spyro the Dragon, StarCraft and Xenogears. Earlier arcade video games such as Virtua Fighter 3 and Tekken 3 were also ported for home consoles in 1998.

The year has been retrospectively considered one of the best in video game history due to the release of numerous critically acclaimed, commercially successful and influential titles across all platforms and genres at the time. A number of publications have ranked 1998 as gaming's best year of all time. It was the peak year for the fifth generation of video game consoles, while the Japanese release of the Dreamcast began the sixth generation of video game consoles.

The year's most critically acclaimed title was The Legend of Zelda: Ocarina of Time, which remains Metacritic's highest-scoring game of all time. The year's best-selling video game console was the PlayStation for the third year in a row. The year's best-selling home video game worldwide was Pokémon Red/Green/Blue/Pikachu for the Game Boy, while the year's highest-grossing arcade game in Japan was Tekken 3.

Events 
Academy of Interactive Arts & Sciences (AIAS) hosts its first annual Interactive Achievement Awards. Shigeru Miyamoto of Nintendo is inducted into the AIAS Hall of Fame.
British Academy of Film and Television Arts hosts the first annual BAFTA Interactive Entertainment Awards.
 January 1 – The ESRB changes the "K-A" (Kids to Adults) rating to "E" (Everyone).
 March 14 – Sega announces the discontinuation of the Sega Saturn in North America to prepare for the launch of its successor, the Dreamcast.
 April 14 – Nintendo's Game Boy Light handheld console is released in Japan.
 May:
 28 – Bill Williams, designer of Alley Cat, Necromancer, and Mind Walker, dies.
 28–30 – The fourth annual E3 is held in Atlanta, Georgia. Following the show, the inaugural Game Critics Awards was held with winners being titled Best of E3.
 July 3 – Danielle Bunten Berry, designer of M.U.L.E. and Seven Cities of Gold, dies.
 September 6 – Infogrames Entertainment, SA and Canal+ launch the Game One television channel.
 October 21 – Nintendo's Game Boy Color handheld console is released in Japan.
 November:
 27 – Sega's Dreamcast console is released in Japan.
 28 – Video game retailer FuncoLand opens its 300th location in Nashville, Tennessee.
December – Take-Two Interactive forms the Rockstar Games publishing label.

Top-rated games

Game of the Year awards 
The following titles won Game of the Year awards for 1998.

Critically acclaimed titles

Famitsu Platinum Hall of Fame 
The following video game releases in 1998 entered Famitsu magazine's "Platinum Hall of Fame" for receiving Famitsu scores of at least 35 out of 40.

Metacritic and GameRankings 
Metacritic (MC) and GameRankings (GR) are aggregators of video game journalism reviews.

Financial performance

Best-selling video game consoles

Best-selling home video games 
The following titles were the top ten best-selling home video games (console games or computer games) of 1998 in Japan, the United States, and Germany.

The following titles were the top ten highest-grossing home video games of 1998 in the United States and Europe.

Japan
In Japan, the following titles were the top ten best-selling home video games of 1998.

United States
In the United States, the following titles were the top ten best-selling home video games of 1998.

Europe
In Europe, the following titles were the top ten highest-grossing home video games of 1998.

Australia
In Australia, the following titles were the top ten best-selling home console games of 1998.

Highest-grossing arcade games in Japan 
In Japan, the following titles were the highest-grossing arcade games of 1998.

Business
Activision acquires CD Contact Data and Head Game Publishing.
Eidos Interactive acquires Crystal Dynamics.
Electronic Arts Inc. acquires Westwood Studios, and with so they also acquire the North American operations of Virgin Interactive.
JTS Corp. (Atari Corporation) files for Chapter 11 bankruptcy.
Hasbro Interactive acquires the Atari brand and property from JTS in May. They also acquire MicroProse in August.
Square Co. and Electronic Arts form Square Electronic Arts LLC to publish a wealth of Square Co. titles in the U.S.
Havas, a subsidiary of Vivendi, acquires Cendant Software, which includes Sierra On-Line and Blizzard Entertainment.
Lego Media established by Lego Group
New companies: BreakAway, Elixir, Metro3D, Rockstar, Sunrise, Troika, WildTangent, Loki, Retro Studios
 Defunct: DWANGO

Game releases
The list of games released in 1998.

January–March

April–June

July–September

October–December

See also
1998 in games

Notes

References

 
Video games by year